The Roman Catholic Diocese of Punalur is a diocese located in the city of Punalur in the Ecclesiastical province of Trivandrum in India.

History
 December 21, 1985: Established as Diocese of Punalur from the Diocese of Quilon

Belgian Carmelite missionaries were the First Fathers of Punalur and of places around Punalur. During the Second World War the First Fathers had to go back, entrusting the church work to the diocesan clergy of Quilon (Kollam).

Punalur was separated from the Diocese of Quilon (Kollam) and created into a separate unit by the Bull “Verba Christi” of Pope John Paul II, issued on 21 December 1985.

Territory
Present Diocese of Punalur extended to the entire taluks of Punalur, Pathanapuram, Kottarakkara, Kunnathur, Mavelikara, Adoor, Konni, Pathanamthitta, Kozhencherry, and several pakuthies of the taluks of Karunagappally, Karthikapally, and Chengannur.

Leadership
 Bishops of Punalur (Roman Church)
 Bishop Selvister Ponnumuthan (May 8, 2009 – present)
 Bishop Joseph Kariyil (March 12, 2005 – May 8, 2009)
 Bishop Mathias Kappil (December 21, 1985 – March 12, 2005)

References

External links
 GCatholic.org 
 Catholic Hierarchy 

Roman Catholic dioceses in India
Christian organizations established in 1985
Roman Catholic dioceses and prelatures established in the 20th century
Dioceses in Kerala
1985 establishments in Kerala
Churches in Thiruvananthapuram district